Castle Rings is a univallate hill fort in the parish of Donhead St Mary in Wiltshire in England. The fort is a Scheduled Ancient Monument, with a list entry identification number of 1005698. Castle Rings has been dated to the Iron Age and is situated at an altitude of  upon Upper Greensand sandstone beds. The main bulk of the fort enclosure lies within the boundaries of Donhead St Mary parish but some of the outlying earthworks are situated in the neighbouring Sedgehill and Semley parish. In the mid-1980s a metal detectorist unearthed a hoard of stater coins of the Durotriges tribe within the hill fort.

Lady Theodora Grosvenor described the fort in her 1867 book Motcombe, Past and Present:

Physical characteristics

There are four gaps in the ramparts, one in each of the cardinal directions, but it is not known if these were original entrances to the fort. The east and west gaps are suspected of being the original entrances while the narrower gaps on the north and south sides are thought to be modern field entrances. The roughly oval rampart of the fort is overgrown with trees and bushes. The interior of Castle Rings is flat and used for pasture; there is no visible evidence of Iron Age occupation.

Western outlier

Coin find
A metal detectorist recovered a hoard of stater coins from within Castle Rings and was subsequently fined for looting a Scheduled Ancient Monument. The coins, which are attributed to the Durotriges, are now in the collection of the British Museum. They were dug up on 13 October 1985 with twelve ceramic fragments; 88 coins were found in all, some 30 of these were said to be contained within the broken pottery. The finder was prosecuted under the Ancient Monuments and Archaeological Areas Act 1979; he was found guilty and fined £100 (equivalent to £ in modern currency). The find was offered for sale to the Salisbury and South Wiltshire Museum, which refused the purchase on the grounds that it neither wished to financially reward a looter nor acquire looted artefacts. In the event, the British Museum paid the finder an amount considerably greater than the fine in order to acquire the hoard and prevent it being returned to the finder; it held that the academic value of the collected hoard outweighed the concerns regarding its acquisition.

The ceramic fragments formed a small necked beaker manufactured on a potter's wheel some time after AD 80 and is of a Roman type dated to after AD 200. The pottery also contained highly corroded remnants of bronze, copper and silver. The coins have been dated to between 60 and 20 BC; there is therefore a mismatch between the late date of the pottery and the pre-Roman coins found within it. It has been suggested that the vessel originally contained a small hoard of mixed metal artefacts but how the Iron Age Durotrigian coins ended up in the Romano-British hoard cannot be explained.

Notes

References

 

Hill forts in Wiltshire
Scheduled monuments in Wiltshire
Iron Age sites in England
Archaeological theft